Latest & Greatest is an album released by the American hard rock band Great White in 2000. It includes re-recordings of many of the bands' hits, with the exception of the live cover of Led Zeppelin's "In the Light", recorded on December 14, 1996, at the Galaxy Theatre in Santa Ana, California, and the October 2, 1999 live recording of "The Angel Song", taken at the House of Blues in Myrtle Beach, South Carolina and "Rollin' Stoned", presented in its original form.

Track listing 
"In the Light" (live) – 6:08
"Rock Me" – 7:08
"Face the Day" – 5:58
"Once Bitten, Twice Shy" – 5:24
"Rollin' Stoned" – 4:10
"Call It Rock n' Roll" – 4:13
"Save Your Love" – 4:41
"Can't Shake It" – 5:10
"House of Broken Love" – 5:57
"Mista Bone" – 5:07
"The Angel Song" (live) – 5:07
"Lady Red Light" – 4:38

Band members 
Jack Russell – lead vocals, percussion
Mark Kendall – lead guitar, percussion, backing vocals
Michael Lardie – rhythm guitar, keyboards, percussion, backing vocals
Sean McNabb – bass
Audie Desbrow – drums

References 

Great White compilation albums
2000 compilation albums
Portrait Records compilation albums